Tūhuru Kōkare (?–1847) was a notable New Zealand tribal leader. Of Māori descent, he identified with the Ngāi Tahu iwi. He was active from about 1800.

References

1847 deaths
Ngāi Tahu people
Year of birth unknown